Pegging is a sexual practice in which a woman performs anal sex on a man by penetrating his anus with a strap-on dildo.

Naming
The neologism "pegging" was popularized due to the sex education movie Bend Over Boyfriend released in 1998. After it became the winning entry in a contest for the "Savage Love" sex advice column, held by Dan Savage in 2001 upon observing that except for the phrase "Strap On Sex" used by Queen and her partner Robert in their national lecture series (Robert was the original Bend Over Boyfriend at the Good Vibrations lectures). The concept lacked a common name and there was no dictionary entry for the act. Other words include "buggery" or "sodomy", but these refer to anal sex in general. "Strap-on sex" can be used for vaginal or anal intercourse between people of any gender using a strap-on, and is thus less precise than pegging. Some queer people prefer "strap-on sex" instead of "pegging" because they feel the latter is too hetero and cis centric.

Beckett and Miller use "pegger" and "peggee" to refer to the person penetrating and the person being penetrated; "top" and "bottom" are also used.

Method
Pegging is penetrative sex with a strap-on dildo, usually anal penetration. It is usually defined as a heterosexual practice in which a woman penetrates the anus of a man. This definition of pegging is very centered around cisgender and heterocentric identities. However, anyone can be penetrated anally regardless of their genitals or gender. The person penetrating their partner uses a strap-on dildo, often a silicone phallus, attached with a harness or strapless (a dildo that also penetrates the pegger). Lubricant is also used.

According to Tristan Taormino, gender and gender roles play an important part in pegging. Pegging reverses traditional cisgender heterosexual gender roles in sexual practices: the man is penetrated by the woman, becoming passive rather than active.

In popular culture

According to Beckett and Miller (2022), most popular representations of pegging are derogatory, negative or even amounting to sexual assault.

Long before the term was coined as such, the 1970 film Myra Breckinridge, based on the novel by Gore Vidal, depicted the first known pegging scene on screen. The first explicit pegging scene is believed to be the 1976 pornographic film The Opening of Misty Beethoven. Marquis de Sade describes a pegging act in his 1795 book Philosophy in the Bedroom. There is a depiction of pegging in the William S. Burroughs 1959 novel Naked Lunch. The dildo used in the scene is called a Steely Dan III, and is the source from which the musical group Steely Dan takes its name. Bend Over Boyfriend (1998) is based on a series of lectures and workshops by Robert Lawrence and Carol Queen. Bend Over Boyfriend originally inspired Dan Savage to call the act "BOBing" but his readers subsequently voted on the winning term, "pegging".

Since the coinage of "pegging", it was featured in the TV show Weeds, on the episode "Crush Girl Love Panic" (2006). Here, pegging appears to be non consensual and is played as a joke towards the male character being forced into anal sex. In the episode "Knockoffs" of the TV series Broad City, Abbi Abrams pegs Jeremy Santos on his request. In the 2016 film Deadpool, Wade Wilson is pegged by his girlfriend Vanessa Carlysle on International Women's Day. In the episode "To Peg Or Not To Peg" of the TV Series The Bold Type, Kat pegs Cody.

References

Bibliography

Further reading
 Blue, Violet (2007) The Adventurous Couple's Guide to Strap-On Sex. Cleis Press. 
 Taormino, Tristan (2006) [1997] The Ultimate Guide to Anal Sex for Women. Cleis Press 

Anal eroticism
BDSM terminology
Sexual acts
Dan Savage
2001 neologisms